The Bootleg Fire, named after the nearby Bootleg Spring, was a large wildfire that started near Beatty, Oregon, on July 6, 2021. Before being fully contained on 15 August 2021, it had burned . It is the third-largest fire in the history of Oregon since 1900.

Events

July 
The Bootleg Fire was first reported on July 6, 2021, at around 1:42 pm PDT near Beatty, Oregon. The Bootleg Fire merged with the smaller Log Fire to the east on July 19, 2021.

As the Bootleg Fire burned east, it approached Mitchell Monument, a memorial to the only civilians killed in the 48 U.S. states during World War II.  To protect the historic site, fire crews trimmed low-hanging tree branches and built a fire line around the monument site.  They also wrapped the tree scarred by the Japanese balloon bomb explosion and the stone monument in a fire-resistant material similar to the material used for firefighters' emergency shelters.  As a result, when the fire passed through the adjacent forest, the monument was undamaged.

Cause 
Lightning was the cause of the fire.

Containment 
The fire was 100% contained on August 15, 2021. At one point, over 2,200 personnel were fighting the fire.

Impact

Closures and evacuations 
Several hundred square miles of southern Oregon, in Klamath and Lake counties, were under evacuation orders of various degrees of severity.

Damage 
A total of 408 buildings were destroyed by the fire, including 161 houses and 247 outbuildings. The fire also destroyed 342 vehicles. The historic Merritt Creek trestle along the OC&E Woods Line State Trail was also destroyed.

Weather 
The fire contributed to haze across the United States and vivid red sunrises and sunsets as far away as Boston and New York City. There were reports of small fire whirls, and officials believed that at least one actual fire tornado formed in the southeastern portion of the fire on July 18.

See also 

 2021 Oregon wildfires

References 

2021 meteorology
2021 in Oregon
2021 Oregon wildfires
July 2021 events in the United States
Wildfires in Oregon